The Daejeon Southern Ring Expressway(), Daejeon Nambu Sunhwan Expressway or Daejeon Southern Beltway is an expressway in South Korea, connecting Honam Expressway Branch (Expressway 251) to Gyeongbu Expressway (Expressway 1) in Daejeon.  Numbered 300, it covers a length of 20.8 kilometers.

History 
 December 1993: Construction Begin.
 6 September 1999: Opens to traffic.

Composition

Lane 
 4 Lanes

Length 
 20.8 km

Limited Speed 
 100 km/h

List of Facilities 

IC: Interchange, JC: Junction, SA: Service Area, TG:Tollgate

See also
Transportation in South Korea
Roads and expressways in South Korea

References

External links 
 MOLIT South Korean Government Transport Department

Expressways in South Korea
Nambu Sunhwan Expressway
Roads in Daejeon